James's gerbil (Dipodillus jamesi) is a species of rodent endemic to the eastern coast of Tunisia.

References

Musser, G. G. and M. D. Carleton. 2005. Superfamily Muroidea. pp. 894–1531 in Mammal Species of the World a Taxonomic and Geographic Reference. D. E. Wilson and D. M. Reeder eds. Johns Hopkins University Press, Baltimore.
  This database entry includes a brief justification of why this species is listed as data deficient.

Dipodillus
Rodents of North Africa
Endemic fauna of Tunisia
Mammals described in 1967
Taxobox binomials not recognized by IUCN